The Central Asia – Center gas pipeline system is a Gazprom controlled system of natural gas pipelines, which run from Turkmenistan via Uzbekistan and Kazakhstan to Russia.  The eastern branch includes the Central Asia - Center (CAC) 1, 2, 4 and 5 pipelines, which start from the south-eastern gas fields of Turkmenistan.  The western branch consists of the CAC-3 pipeline and a project to build a new parallel Caspian pipeline. The western branch runs from the Caspian Sea coast of Turkmenistan to north.   The branches meet in western Kazakhstan.  From there the pipelines run to north where they are connected to the Russian natural gas pipeline system.

History
The system was built between 1960 and 1988.  Construction began after discovery of Turkmenistan's Dzharkak field in the Amu Darya Basin, and the first section of the pipeline was completed in 1960.  CAC-1 and 2 were commissioned in 1969 and CAC-4 was commissioned in 1973.  In 1976, two parallel lines were laid between Shatlyk compressor station and Khiva.  CAC-5 was commissioned in 1985 and in 1986-88 the Dauletabad–Khiva line was connected.  The western branch (CAC-3) was constructed in 1972-1975.

In 2003, the late President of Turkmenistan Saparmurat Niyazov proposed to renovate existing systems and construct a new parallel pipeline to the western branch.  On 12 May 2007, Vladimir Putin of Russia, Nursultan Nazarbayev of Kazakhstan and Gurbanguly Berdimuhamedow of Turkmenistan signed a memorandum for renovation and expansion of the western branch of the pipeline. On 20 December 2007, Russia, Turkmenistan and Kazakhstan finalized agreement on construction of the Caspian Coastal Pipeline parallel to the existing CAC-3 pipeline (known as Bekdash–Europe pipeline or Okarem–Beineu pipeline).

Technical features
Almost all Uzbek and Turkmen natural gas is delivered through the CAC pipeline system, mainly through the eastern branch due to location of production sites and poor technical condition of the western branch. CAC-1, 2, 4 and 5 pipelines are supplied from gas fields in the South-East of Turkmenistan, mainly from the Dauletabad gas field. The eastern branch starts from the Dauletabad field and continues through the Shatlyk gas field east of Tejen to Khiva, Uzbekistan. From there the pipeline system transports gas north-west along Amu Darya to the Kungrad compressor station in Uzbekistan. From Kungrad, most of the gas is carried via Kazakhstan to the Alexandrov Gay gas metering station in Russia. At Alexandrov Gay CAC pipelines meet with Soyuz and Orenburg–Novopskov pipelines. From there two lines run northwest to Moscow, and two others proceed across the Volga river to the North Caucasus-Moscow transmission system. Current capacity of the system is 44 billion cubic meters (bcm) per year. An agreement is in place to increase capacity to 55 bcm per year by 2010 and through modernization there is potential to increase capacity to 90 bcm per year.

The western branch originates at Okarem near the Turkmenistan–Iran border and runs north. It is supplied by gas from fields scattered along the Caspian coast between Okarem and Balkanabat. It continues via Uzen in Kazakhstan to the Beyneu compressor station, where it meets the eastern branch of the CAC.

Caspian coastal pipeline
On 20 December 2007, Russia, Turkmenistan and Kazakhstan agreed to construct a new Caspian pipeline parallel to the existing CAC-3 pipeline.  The pipeline is planned be built between Belek compressor station in Turkmenistan and Alexandrov Gay compressor station.  Capacity of the new pipeline will be 20–30 bcm per year and it would be supplied from the planned East–West pipeline.  Construction of the pipeline was to start in the second half of 2009.  However, the project was mothballed.

See also

 Central Asia–China gas pipeline
 Bukhara–Tashkent–Bishkek–Almaty pipeline
 Trans-Caspian Gas Pipeline
 Kazakhstan–China oil pipeline

References

Further reading
Chow, Edward, "Central Asia’s Pipelines: Field of Dreams and Reality," in Pipeline Politics in Asia: The Intersection of Demand, Energy Markets, and Supply Routes (National Bureau of Asian Research, 2010)

Natural gas pipelines in Russia
Natural gas pipelines in Turkmenistan
Natural gas pipelines in Uzbekistan
Natural gas pipelines in Kazakhstan
Natural gas pipelines in the Soviet Union
Buildings and structures built in the Soviet Union
1969 establishments in the Soviet Union
Energy in Central Asia
Gazprom pipelines
Kazakhstan–Russia relations
Kazakhstan–Turkmenistan relations
Kazakhstan–Uzbekistan relations
Russia–Turkmenistan relations
Russia–Uzbekistan relations
Turkmenistan–Uzbekistan relations
Soviet Central Asia